The Mask Line Thai is the sixth season of The Mask Singer, a Thai singing competition program presented by Kan Kantathavorn. The program aired on Workpoint TV on Thursday at 20:05 from 25 October 2018 to 7 March 2019.

The tournament format is similar to that of Project A, But the difference is this season was combined with the uniqueness of Thai culture (example: Mask costumes, Thai music etc.)

Panel of Judges

First round

Group 1 Mai Ek

Group 2 Mai Tho

Group 3 Mai Tri

Group 4 Mai Chattawa

Semi-final

Group 1 Mai Ek

Group 2 Mai Tho

Group 3 Mai Tri

Group 4 Mai Chattawa

Final

Champ VS Champ

First round

Second round

Champ of the Champ

Celebration of The Mask Champion

Elimination table

The Mask Line Prang 
The Mask Line Prang is a Thai special program about guess singers in masks after the finished Line Thai series that aired 20 episodes. The word Prang (พราง) means camouflage. This special program broadcast only 2 episodes presented by Kan Kantathavorn. It airs on Workpoint TV on Thursday at 20:05, starting from 14–21 March 2019.

References

The Mask Singer (Thai TV series)
2018 Thai television seasons
2019 Thai television seasons